Omphalagria is a genus of moths of the family Noctuidae.

Species
 Omphalagria hemiochra Hampson, 1910
 Omphalagria togoensis Gaede, 1915

References
Natural History Museum Lepidoptera genus database
Omphalagria at funet

Hadeninae